Atalar is a village in the Mazıdağı District of Mardin Province in Turkey. The village is populated by Kurds of the Abasan and Rutan tribes and had a population of 260 in 2021.

References 

Villages in Mazıdağı District
Kurdish settlements in Mardin Province